Rysher Entertainment, Inc. was an American film and television production company and distributor. It was best known for the sitcom Hogan's Heroes and the medical drama Ben Casey. In 1993, Rysher was acquired by Cox Enterprises, and was closed six years later in 1999.

History

Keith Samples established the company in April 1991, as an independent company, whose sole product had been the distribution of the series Saved by the Bell (at the time, NBC could not distribute it in syndication due to fin-syn rules). Encouraged by the success, it made its second move with their first foray into animation, Captain N and the Video Game Masters, the off-net syndicated version of the DIC Entertainment series that also aired on NBC, Captain N: The Game Master. Also that year, it attempted to merge with film and television production company The Kushner-Locke Company, only for the deal to be aborted.

Also that year, Cox Enterprises was in discussions to purchase the studio and helped them merge with TPE. It was considered that later that year that Gay Rosenthal was inking a deal with the studio to distribute their own projects. The Cox/Rysher merger was finalized, and soon afterwards, Rysher merged with Al Masini's Television Program Enterprises to form Rysher TPE, its alternate name used from 1993 to 1994, and helped them to syndicate California Dreams, with Keith Samples remaining at the helm.

Through it, they produced and distributed shows, such as Lifestyles of the Rich and Famous (renamed Lifestyles with Robin Leach and Shari Belafonte for the final season) and Star Search. Later, they produced and distributed George & Alana. The company branched out into feature films, and in the span of three years had produced over two dozen. In late 1993, Beverly Hills 90210 star Gabrielle Carteris, through GABCO Productions struck a deal with Rysher TPE for a production/distribution agreement.

In May 1995, Rysher entered into a five-film domestic distribution arrangement with Metro-Goldwyn-Mayer (MGM). The company closed the film unit due to underperforming box-office sales in July 1997. Later that year, in 1997, Papazian-Hrsch Entertainment struck a deal with Rysher to develop their TV projects.

In 1998, Rysher collaborated with HBO to distribute some of the series outside of the United States, including Arli$$, Oz and Sex and the City. The company was closed in 1999 after Viacom entered an agreement with Cox Enterprises, allowing Paramount Pictures and its television unit to handle distribution rights. The company's library is incorporated into  CBS Media Ventures for television series and Paramount Pictures for films (except The Opposite of Sex). The company's films and series included Hogan's Heroes (whose partial rights are held by CBS), Ben Casey, Walking Tall, Nash Bridges (continued by Paramount Network Television), Highlander: The Series, Kingpin, and Big Night. In 1998, Rysher and CBS Productions jointly purchased the Ann-Margret CBS drama Four Corners from Columbia TriStar Television.

The company's assets were acquired by 2929 Entertainment in 2001. They were bought by Qualia Capital, LLC. in 2006, and were merged with Gaylord Films and Pandora Entertainment. The combined entity became known as Qualia Libraries Co. and the brand name served as a limited partnership, and now owns the trademark to Hogan's Heroes. In 2011, Qualia Libraries Co. was acquired by affiliates of Vine Alternative Investments which were integrated into Lakeshore Entertainment in 2015. Vine acquired Lakeshore's library and international sales operations in November 2019. Viacom merged with CBS Corporation, under the name ViacomCBS (now Paramount Global), as a single distribution company in December. CBS Media Ventures currently holds the rights to the television library, while the ancillary, home media and worldwide distribution rights to the film library lie with Paramount Pictures, with Trifecta Entertainment handling North American television rights.

Television programs

Feature films

References 

2929 Entertainment holdings
Defunct film and television production companies of the United States
Mass media companies established in 1945
Mass media companies disestablished in 1999
Television production companies of the United States
Television syndication distributors